Balberra is a coastal locality in the Mackay Region, Queensland, Australia.

Geography 
The northern boundary of the locality is Sandy Creek, the southern boundary is Bell Creek and Alligator Creek, and the western boundary is B L Creek. The eastern tip of the locality is at the joint mouth of Sandy Creek and Alligator Creek as they flow into the Coral Sea.

The Bruce Highway passes through the locality from the north (Chelona) to the south east (Alligator Creek). The North Coast railway line passes through the locality to the west of the highway; Balberra railway station serves the locality.

The predominant land use is growing crops, particularly sugar cane. There is a network of cane tramways in the locality to transport the harvested cane to the sugar mills.

History 
The locality appears to take its name from the railway station, which in turn was named in 1913 and takes its name from an Aboriginal word meaning creek.

Education 
There are no schools in Balberra. The nearest primary schools are in the neighbouring localities of Chelona and Alligator Creek. The nearest secondary schools are in Mackay and Sarina.

References 

Mackay Region
Coastline of Queensland
Localities in Queensland